The Hajji Et'hem Bey Mosque is a mosque in Tirana, Albania. Closed under communist rule, the mosque reopened as a house of worship in 1991. Without permission from the authorities, 10,000 people attended and the police did not interfere. Frescoes outside and in the portico depict trees, waterfalls and bridges.

History 
Construction was started in 1791 or 1794 by Molla Bey and it was finished in 1819 or 1821 by his son Haxhi Ethem Bey, grand-grandson of Sulejman Pasha.

At the time it was built it was part of complex buildings that compose the historical center of Tirana. In front of mosque was the old Bazaar, in east the Sulejman Pasha Mosque, which was built on 1614 and destroyed during World War II, and in the north-west the Karapici mosque.

During the totalitarianism of the Socialist People's Republic of Albania, the mosque was closed. On January 18, 1991, despite opposition from communist authorities, 10,000 people entered carrying flags. This was at the onset of the fall of communism in Albania. The event was a milestone in the rebirth of religious freedom in Albania.

The Mosque today, consists of an architectural complex together with the Clock Tower of Tirana.
Tours of the mosque are given daily, though not during prayer service. Visitors must take their shoes off before entering the inner room.

Architecture 
The Et'hem Bey Mosque is composed by prayer hall, a portico that surrounds its north and the minaret. On the north side is the entrance to the prayer hall, which is a squared plan and is constructed in a unique volume. It is covered with dome and the dome is semi-spherical and has no windows. The frescoes of the mosque depict trees, waterfalls and bridges.

See also 
 Islam in Albania
 Timeline of Islamic history
 Islamic architecture
 Islamic art
 List of mosques

References 

1819 establishments in the Ottoman Empire
Mosques completed in 1819
Ottoman architecture in Albania
Mosques in Tirana
Cultural Monuments of Albania
Ottoman mosques